The Sowind Group is an independent collective of fine watchmaking manufactures comprising the Girard-Perregaux and Ulysse Nardin Swiss brands.

History 
Based in La Chaux-de-Fonds, the Group incorporates the Girard-Perregaux and Ulysse Nardin brands, that develops and produces a complete portfolio of high-end movements (more than 100 variations of existing movements) and collections of top-of-the-range watches.

See also
List of watch manufactures

Bibliography
François Chaille, Girard-Perregaux, Editions Flammarion, 2004, 
ArmbandUhren, Special Girard-Perregaux, Peter Braun, 2007,

References

External links
Official Website 
Official Website 

1791 establishments in Europe
Watch manufacturing companies of Switzerland
Watch brands
Luxury brands
18th-century establishments in Switzerland

de:Girard-Perregaux
es:Girard-Perregaux
fr:Girard-Perregaux
ja:ジラール・ペルゴ
pt:Girard-Perregaux
fi:Girard-Perregaux